Lord Darcy is a detective in a fantasy alternate history, created by Randall Garrett. The first stories were asserted to take place in the same year as they were published, but in a world with an alternate history that is different from our own and that is governed by the rules of magic rather than the rules of physics. Despite the magical trappings, the Lord Darcy stories play fair as whodunnits; magic is never used to "cheat" a solution, and indeed, the mundane explanation is often obscured by the leap to assume a magical cause.

Title character
Lord Darcy is the Chief Forensic Investigator or Chief Criminal Investigator for the Duke of Normandy (Prince Richard, the brother of the king), and sometime Special Investigator for the High Court of Chivalry. An Englishman, he lives in Rouen, but spends very little time there. The audience learns that he speaks Anglo-French with an English accent, and that he speaks several languages and dialects fluently.

His full name is never given; he is always referred to by his title as the Lord of Arcy (i.e., Lord d'Arcy or Lord Darcy), even by his friends. He dresses in the style of an English aristocrat. He thinks of himself as English and yet Arcy seems to be a French place name. How he comes to be addressed as a "Lord" is never explained, though he seems deferential when dealing with other Peers such as Dukes, Counts, and a Marquis. In Too Many Magicians Darcy is said to be a cousin of the Marquis of London.

There are two conflicting reports of Lord Darcy's age. In "The Muddle of the Woad" he's described as a few years older than the King, who's ten years older than the Duke of Normandy, who was 19 years old in "The Eyes Have It", which is set in 1963. This places Lord Darcy's date of birth around 1931. However, he's described in "The Spell of War" as an 18-year-old lieutenant in the autumn of the War of '39, which would make him about ten years older.

His assistant is Master Sean O'Lochlainn, a sorcerer who undertakes magical forensic work. Master Sean is highly proud of Irish magic and its superiority to those of other countries (especially to Polish magic).

Works
Too Many Magicians is the only Lord Darcy novel written by Randall Garrett: it first appeared in Analog magazine from August to November 1966 and was issued in book form by Doubleday in 1967. This was followed by two short story collections: Murder and Magic (1979), and Lord Darcy Investigates (1981), containing stories that had appeared in Analog, Fantastic and other magazines. Garrett's extended illness and death prevented him from writing more Lord Darcy tales as he had intended.

Two more Lord Darcy novels, Ten Little Wizards (1988), and A Study in Sorcery (1989), were written by Garrett's friend Michael Kurland after Garrett's death. The two titles were manifestly modeled on those of famous detective novels by, respectively, Agatha Christie and Arthur Conan Doyle. This is similar to the way that Too Many Magicians was modeled on a famous novel by Rex Stout (whose Nero Wolfe and Archie Goodwin have counterparts in the novel's universe in the Marquis de London and his Special Investigator, Lord Bontriomphe). In the eleventh chapter of Ten Little Wizards, Kurland sets Lord Darcy's rank in the peerage as a Baron.

Short stories
 "The Eyes Have It" (1964)
 "A Case of Identity" (1964)
 "The Muddle of the Woad" (1965)
 "A Stretch of the Imagination" (1973)
 "Matter of Gravity" (1974)
 "The Ipswich Phial" (1976)
 "The Sixteen Keys" (1976)
 "The Bitter End" (1978)
 "The Napoli Express" (1979)
 "The Spell of War" (1979)

Novel
 Too Many Magicians (1967)

Novels by Michael Kurland
 Ten Little Wizards (1988)
 A Study in Sorcery (1989)

Also:  Michael Kurland's 1969 novel The Unicorn Girl features protagonists who jump into a series of alternate timelines — and one of the timelines they land in is Lord Darcy's.  However, while several minor characters from the Lord Darcy series appear in The Unicorn Girl, neither Lord Darcy nor Master Sean are featured.

Collections
 Murder and Magic (1979) contains short stories 1, 2, 3, and 4
 Lord Darcy Investigates (1981) contains short stories 5, 6, 7, and 9
Lord Darcy (1983) omnibus edition containing:
Murder and Magic (see above)
Too Many Magicians (see above)
Lord Darcy Investigates (see above)
Lord Darcy 2002 edition
Includes all ten short stories, and Too Many Magicians.

Reception
In 1999, Randall Garrett won the Sidewise Award for Alternate History Special Achievement Award for the Lord Darcy series.

The Lord Darcy series is described in The Encyclopedia of Science Fiction as Garrett's "most impressive solo work".

Darcy's world

Magic
Magic is a scientific discipline, codified in the fourteenth century by Saint Hilary Robert, much involved with higher mathematics and possessed of theoretical and experimental underpinnings as sophisticated as those of our physics and chemistry. Licensed Sorcerers, possessed of the Talent and properly trained, achieve a wide range of effects. Healing by the laying on of hands is effective and a commonplace treatment for disease and injury; thanks to the efficacy of the Healers, it is common for people to live to the age of 100 and not rare for people to live to 125.

Black magic is not a categorically different type of magic, but a matter of symbolism and intent, at least in the Anglo-French sphere, as the Kingdom of Italy requests extradition of a woman for black magic when her actual offense was no more than unlicensed magic. However, the effect of symbolism and intent can be substantial; one character, a Witch-Smeller, is capable of detecting its effects on the black magician and his victims.

Although magic is a central part of all the stories, none of the murders Lord Darcy investigates is directly caused by magic. All the homicides are committed by mundane means.

Social structure
France and the British Isles are combined into a single state as the Anglo-French Empire, and  Russia, Italy, and Germany continue as loose collections of small states. Society is stratified, with the most important government positions are held by nobles, who dispense justice and still maintain private soldiers. The Church is powerful and a central component of everyone's life (there had never been a Reformation, or it took a very different form, as some of the worst abuses of the late-Medieval/Renaissance Catholic Church seem to have been eliminated or minimized). However, serfdom is as dead as in our own world, and the rights of the common people appear to be as well protected as in our world's Western democracies, if in different ways.

Anglo-French regard themselves as fortunate in comparison to the subjects of the Polish King, who are reported to be living under a terrible tyranny. The characters expressing that are all living in the Anglo-French countries, but include a Polish refugee, who was accused by the Italian government of black magic and is compelled to spy for Poland by a threat to her uncle.

Education
Little is mentioned of education, although Oxford continues. Lord Darcy is mentioned as being a graduate of the fictional Magog College (1954). A fictional St. Thomas' Academy is also mentioned.

Technology
Technology and physical sciences have suffered somewhat with the emphasis on magic.  Physics has not been codified as a science; the one example of an investigator into the discipline is an eccentric on a par with the members of our own Flat Earth Society. Most mechanical devices are approximately those of our Victorian era. Characters travel by horse-drawn carriage and steam train and employ revolving pistols and bolt-action rifles; buildings are illuminated with gas lights. An electric torch, with magical parts, is "a fantastic device, a secret of His Majesty's Government."  Messages can be sent by an electrical device called the "teleson", but the principles by which it operates are not well understood, and the technology to lay teleson lines underwater or over water has not yet been developed and so it is impossible to communicate across the Channel.

Food is sometimes preserved in iceboxes; a magical "food preservator" has been invented, but preservators are expensive and rare because the stasis spell used is expensive to maintain, requiring the services of a specialist Journeyman or Master-grade magician. Sorcery is commonly employed in murder investigations, in much the same fashion as forensic science in our own world. Medical technology is not as advanced as in our world, because Healers are so effective, indeed the use of drugs with a genuine but non-magical benefit ("may cover a wound with moldy bread... or give a patient with heart trouble a tea brewed of foxglove") is regarded as little more than superstition.

International situation
The Anglo-French Empire was established by the Plantagenets, whose dynasty has continued to rule and continues to use the Palace of Westminster as a royal residence, with Parliament far weaker than in our timeline. Richard I returned to England after he was wounded at the siege of Chaluz, but he later recovered and ruled well, but John Lackland never held the throne and died in exile. Richard then went on to a decisive victory in the Anglo-French War, which, in our history, King John lost. Richard dethroned the Capetian Dynasty and made himself and his successors Kings of France as well as of England, both kingdoms being ruled from London, while Paris was left into the 20th century a provincial town that broods over its lost glory.

The Duchy of Normandy remained attached to the English crown and never separated from it. Richard died in 1219 and was succeeded by his nephew Arthur, whose reign was remembered as a Golden Age and sometimes confused in the popular imagination with that of King Arthur. The present king, 750 years later, is "John IV, by the Grace of God, King and Emperor of England, France, Scotland, Ireland [all the Anglo-French Empire], New England [North America], and New France [South America]; Defender of the Faith, et cetera".

To judge by the Irishman who has a central role in the stories, the Irish in this timeline do not feel particularly oppressed under the Anglo-French throne and have no inclination to become independent. Ireland seems to have been spared traumatic periods of foreign colonisation and dispossession, and since everybody is Catholic, it has no problems of rival religious-ethnic communities. Moreover, the Irish are considered especially skilled in Magic, a source of upwards social mobility and prestige.

The king is also Holy Roman Emperor, exercising loose sovereignty over the many small German and Italian states. However, his actual exercise of sovereignty is limited by the ability of German states to call upon the Poles for help. The chronologically-first but not the first-written Lord Darcy story takes place during a military confrontation between Anglo-French and Polish forces on the soil of Bavaria.

In Italy, the King-Emperor is more of a constitutional monarch, with an Italian Parliament seemingly holding much more power than the one in London (in a story set in Italy, a local policeman emphasizes that his oath of office is to the Parliament, rather than to the King). There is no mention, however, of whether the Parliament is appointed or elected or by whom. Italy being united implies that the Catholic Church was, like in our history, deprived at some time of its Temporal power over the city of Rome and its environs, but there is no mention of when and how that happened.

Poland is a major power and the chief rival of the Anglo-French, and both exist in a situation of Cold War; some of the stories are spy thrillers in which Lord Darcy is pitted against Polish agents and takes on some of the attributes of James Bond (with some magic ingredients added, such as a spell used to make him fall madly in love with a beautiful female Polish agent).

Hungary is part of the Polish Empire (the University of Buda-Pest is mentioned as one of Poland's major institutes of learning), which seems to extend southwards into the Balkans. It is stated that Kiev is part of the Polish Empire, as well as most of the Ukrainian steppe. The Russias are no more than a set of fractious statelets, which might unify in the face of Polish aggression but as yet have failed to do so (it had been close to that situation in some periods of our own history, as during the Polish-Muscovite War (1605–1618)).

The main strategy of the Anglo-French is to bottle up the Poles and deny them access to the world's oceans. There is mention of a war in the 1940s (roughly equivalent to World War II but of a much more limited extent) in which the Polish Navy was decisively beaten. Since then, an alliance with the Scandinaviams at the exit from the Baltic and with the Roumelians (Byzantines) at the exit from the Black Sea denies passage to Polish warships, but they try to circumvent this blockade and build an ocean-going navy with the help of some African states.

As noted, the Byzantine Empire continues to exist and is, at least at times, an Anglo-French ally, but it is a minor power corresponding to our Greece, with its main importance being the control of the strategic Dardanelles. The Osmanlis rule a realm beyond it that has apparently never spread beyond Anatolia. The Kingdoms of Castile and Aragon never united into a single Spanish realm and were never of much account, and Southern Spain is still predominantly Muslim (one story features a suave Muslim from Granada residing in London).

Since the Point of Departure, which set the alternate history off is the survival of Richard the Lion Heart until 1219 and his success in eliminating the Capetians and making himself King of France, the Fourth Crusade of 1204, which fatally crippled the Byzantine Empire in our history, presumably never took place in this history. Also, with John Lackland never taking the throne, he never had a chance to behave tyrannically as a king and so there was no rebellion culminating in the Magna Carta, which may very partially explain the lack of any democratic institutions in this 20th century. (Garrett may have thus meant to imply that the villains of history sometimes have their uses.)

Mexico (Mechicoe in Anglo-French) is still ruled by Aztecs, who are headed by the Christianised descendants of Montezuma after they have been taken into the empire's high nobility and possess considerable autonomy. North America, the whole of which is called "New England", is in the process of being settled by Europeans, but the process is far less advanced than in our history, with Native American tribes in the 1960s still able to offer significant resistance to whites encroaching on their land. However, there is also mention of thriving tobacco plantations, which seems to indicate that the equivalent of the American South is more thickly settled than the American North. Mention is made of the first European ships reaching the shores of new England in 1569.

Little is mentioned of "New France" (South America) beyond a single mention of its jungles being a punitive posting to unruly soldiers from which it is clear that Native inhabitants are far from completely subdued there either.

There are only few references to Africa. Lord Darcy's father, who was an army "coronel" (colonel), is mentioned as having fought in a war at Sudan, which might be not exactly the same as our timeline's state of that name. In West Africa, black states are mentioned as maintaining their independence, keeping a balance between the Anglo-French and the Poles and possessing enough technology to equip modern warships. The impression given is that Africa was not as heavily touched by colonialism as in our timeline. (Presumably, that is because the Anglo-French have a whole continent at their disposal on the other side of the Atlantic and do their best to bar Polish access.)

Allusions

Allusions in the Lord Darcy stories
As in many of Garrett's other writings, he takes every opportunity to insert subtle, or otherwise, allusions to other fiction — in these stories there are many echoes of other classic, or otherwise, detectives.  For example, in Too Many Magicians there is a cameo appearance by the Marquis de London, who looks and talks like Nero Wolfe, an identification reinforced by his sidekick Lord Bontriomphe (whose name is a literal French translation of "Goodwin") and his cook Frederique Bruleur (corresponding to Wolfe's cook Fritz Brenner). The title, furthermore, echoes Wolfe novels Too Many Cooks (1938), Too Many Women (1947) and Too Many Clients (1960).  That novel also contains a number of punning references to The Man from U.N.C.L.E.. More subtly, the murder victim, a famous Master Sorcerer named Sir James Zwinge, is named for Randall James Zwinge, better known as the stage magician James Randi; and the head of the magician's guild is Sir Lyon Gandolphus Gray, whose name is partially a reference to Gandalf from J. R. R. Tolkien and partially that of fantasy author Lyon Sprague de Camp, and whose appearance as described partakes of both men's appearance.  In the short story "The Bitter End", a bumbling Sergeant-at-Arms is named Cougair Chasseur, a clear reference to Inspector Clouseau of the Pink Panther movies.  And in several stories there is a secret agent, Sir James le Lein (le lien is French for "bond"; a clear James Bond reference).

The story "A Case Of Identity" also contains two subtle references to contract bridge, including a magic spell for establishing identity called the Jacoby transfer which requires blood from "at least two hearts."  This is an allusion to a bridge convention known as transfer bidding, which attempts to make the stronger, concealed hand the declarer, and always results in a contract of at least Two Hearts.  Also in the story, the murder victim is described as having been struck with a long club, because "according to the Kaplan–Sheinwold test, a short club cannot have been used."  In the Kaplan–Sheinwold bidding system, making an opening bid of "one club" when holding two or fewer club cards-a "short club"-is not permitted.

The story "The Sixteen Keys" contains a reference to the "von Horst–Shea" process, whereby a person can maintain a lifelong youthful appearance, at the expense of a much shorter life, and a sudden dissolution at the end of it.  This is done by a magical "balancing" of the body's processes, so that no one part of the body wears out before any other.  This is a clear reference to the name of, and events in, Oliver Wendell Holmes' poem, "The Wonderful One-Hoss Shay".

In two stories, Darcy encounters a magical reference to E. E. "Doc" Smith's Lensman series: King's Messengers, couriers who identify themselves with a be-gemmed badge that glows red for its owner, and only its owner. The spell on the badge is said to be invented by magician Sir Edward Elmer in the Thirties, and to have remained secret ever since. "E.E." was short for Edward Elmer, and the badges are a reference to a device which preceded the Lens which gave the Lensmen their name.

Darcy himself resembles Sherlock Holmes in a number of ways.  However, unlike Watson, whose primary purpose was to allow Holmes to explain his deductions, Sean O'Lochlainn is more of a counterpart than a foil.  The relationship between the two is very similar to that of the suave, analytical Napoleon Solo (Darcy) and technical expert Illya Kuryakin (O'Lochlainn).

Sometime Garrett collaborator Michael Kurland (who would himself write later Lord Darcy works, with the permission of Garrett's estate) appears as Sergeant-at-Arms Michael Coeur-Terre in Too Many Magicians; and in "A Case of Identity"  the Marquise of Rouen, worried about her missing husband, is described as drinking herself into a stupor on "the best brandy, the St. Courlande-Michele." Similarly several books feature a magical theorist named Sir Thomas Leseaux, a play on another of Garrett's friends, the author and stage magician T. A. Waters; indeed, during the events of The Unicorn Girl Lesaux and Waters come face-to-face.

The strong relation between Lord Darcy and Master Sean O'Lochlainn in some ways recalls that between Dorothy L. Sayers's Lord Peter Wimsey and his servant Mervyn Bunter. In both cases there is a successful detection team composed of a nobleman and a commoner, with a built-in social hierarchy tempered by a strong and long-lasting personal friendship; in both cases, the commoner partner is an extremely capable and competent person, highly appreciated by his socially-superior noble partner; and in both cases, the partnership started as a wartime relationship between an officer and an NCO, and carried over into civilian life. Garrett's debt to Sayers and Lord Peter Wimsey perhaps strayed over the line in "A Matter Of Gravity" in which the method of murder was essentially a direct copy of the method in Sayers' "Busman's Honeymoon." In addition, in the story "The Muddle of the Woad," the surnames of the men employed in the cabinetmaker's shop are the surnames of characters in Sayers' The Nine Tailors.

The story "The Napoli Express", a mystery taking place on board a socially-prestigious train travelling from London to Naples, is clearly related to the considerable subgenre of works whose plots take place on board the Orient Express. Also, Lord Darcy is traveling under the alias of Father Armand Brun. At one point, he says, "I have worked with criminals, and I have heard their confessions many times ... I think I can say I have some insight into the criminal mind."

Allusions to the Lord Darcy stories in other works
Kurland's later short story The Rite Stuff (first published in anthology Sorceror's Tales, 2004) features some of the same magical concepts specified in the Lord Darcy stories, but set on an Earth where T. Lesaux discovered the laws of magic in the nineteenth century and where society has developed a more superstitious concept of magic that doubts the credibility of forensic sorcerers like protagonist Dr. Jonathan Stryk. The 'alternate history' elements include attenuated scientific development (the internal combustion engine does not seem to have been invented), and references to Daniel Webster, Huey Long and Eleanor Roosevelt as former Presidents of the United States.

Elizabeth Bear, whose novel New Amsterdam is set in a (quite different) alternate timeline where magic works, acknowledged her debt to the Darcy stories by giving her protagonist, a forensic sorceress, the name Abigail Irene Garrett.

In David Weber's Honorverse novel Mission of Honor, a character is reading "a novel about the psychically gifted detective Garrett Randall by the highly popular Darcy Lord."

One of the many alternate history timelines visited in Michael Flynn's The Forest of Time is one in which "The Angevin Kings still rule". Flynn's traveler is generously hosted by a Goodman de Veres and his wife, living on the site of Philadelphia, and hears from his hosts about "what sounds like scientific magic" whose practice is widespread in this world. The traveler, versed in the science of our 20th Century, is skeptical and suspects this reputed magic to be "superstition or mass delusion", but is too polite to share this skepticism with his hosts - and anyway, he must soon depart.

The second volume of the Greenwich Village Trilogy, The Unicorn Girl by Michael Kurland, has a cameo of Garret's Sir Thomas Leseaux as the protagonists pass through an alternate of the Lord Darcy universe.

Similarity with Times Without Number

Though having a completely different historical origin, Lord Darcy's 20th century has many similarities with that of John Brunner's Times Without Number. In both there is a Catholic Empire based in London and ruling the British Islands, France and the entire Western Hemisphere (with Christianized Native Americans accepted into its aristocracy). And in both works the Empire depicted is monarchial and conservative, without any trace of democracy, but still relatively benevolent; locked in a decades-long cold war with an Eastern European rival; technologically backward compared to our world, but still possessing a key field of knowledge (magic, time travel) unknown to our 20th century.

References

External links

Listing on SciFan
 Usenet - Rec.arts.sf.written: Postings 5-40 and 105-108.  "References in Lord Darcy (was Purple's name....)", April–May 1999

Alternate history characters
Alternate history book series
Fictional gentleman detectives
Fictional historical detectives
Fictional lords and ladies
Sidewise Award for Alternate History winning works
Series of books